Virginia's 98th House of Delegates district elects one of the 100 members of the Virginia House of Delegates, the lower house of the state's bicameral legislature. The district is made up of the Middle Peninsula counties of Essex, Gloucester, King and Queen, Mathews and Middlesex, and part of King William County.

The 98th district has been represented by Republican Keith Hodges since 2012.

List of delegates

References

External links
 

Virginia House of Delegates districts
Essex County, Virginia
Gloucester County, Virginia
King and Queen County, Virginia
Mathews County, Virginia
King William County, Virginia